Way Up Thar is a 1935 American short western comedy musical film directed by Mack Sennett.

Cast
Joan Davis ...  Jennie Kirk
Myra Keaton ...  Maw Kirk
John W. Jackson ...  Jim Higgins
June Gittelson ...  Sophie Cramer
Al Lydell ...  Sam Higgins
Richard Cramer ...  Cramer
Louise Keaton ...  Liddie
Sons of the Pioneers ...  Hillbilly Band
Bob Nolan ...  Band Member
Roy Rogers ...  Band Member (as Leonard Slye)
Tim Spencer ...  Band Member
Hugh Farr ...  Band Member

External links 
 

1935 films
1935 musical comedy films
1930s Western (genre) comedy films
American black-and-white films
Mack Sennett Comedies short films
American Western (genre) comedy films
American musical comedy films
Educational Pictures short films
1930s Western (genre) musical films
American Western (genre) musical films
Films directed by Mack Sennett
1930s English-language films
1930s American films